James Scully (born 1937, New Haven, Connecticut) is an American poet.  Died 12/11/20.

Biography
Scully attended Roman Catholic grammar and high schools. He was a beneficiary of the post–World War II economic expansion, including tuition-free access to a local teachers college. In 1964, supported by a National Defense Fellowship, he received a Ph.D. from the University of Connecticut.

Recently he published a journal of impressions, incorporating historical information following a visit to the former Yugoslavia.  This was published originally in Serbian translation.  Azul Editions published the English language text: Vagabond Flags: Serbia & Kosovo (2009).
 
Angel in Flames: Selected Poems & Translations 1967-2011 is the most recent of eleven books of poems.  A collection of critical essays, Line Break: Poetry As Social Practice (1988) was reissued in 2005 with a foreword by Adrienne Rich.  The many translations and co-translations include Aeschylus' Prometheus Bound (1975) with C J Herington, “The Complete Plays of Sophocles” (2011) with Robert Bagg, various Latin American texts plus Quechua texts or songs teased from Spanish translations.  He was the founding editor of the Art on the Line series published by Curbstone Press: booklets of essays and interviews by 20th century artists and writers speaking to where their art and their social engagement interact.

Awards
 Winner of the 1967 Lamont Award for "The Marches".
 recipient of a 1973 Guggenheim Fellowships. "Santiago Poems".
 Fellowships from the National Endowment for the Arts
 Ingram Merrill Foundation Fellowship (Rome, Italy 1962 - 1963)
 Quechua Peoples Poetry, Winner of the 1977 Islands & Continents Translation Award
 Jenny Taine Memorial Award
 Bookbuilders of Boston Award for book cover design (“Apollo Helmet” 1983)
 California State University, Chico has named a poetry reading series for him.

Works

Poetry
 
 
 
 Boxcars (Azul Editions 2006)
 Words Without Music (Privately Printed limited edition 2004)
 
 
 
 
 
 
 
 Communications (with Grandin Conover, Poetry Signature Six, The Massachusetts review, 1970)

Translations

Essays

References

External links
 "James Scully," Poetry Foundation. https://www.poetryfoundation.org/poets/james-scully

University of Connecticut faculty
American male poets
1937 births
Living people